Jonathan David Jaques (born January 2, 1988) is an American-Israeli assistant men's basketball coach for Cornell University. He played college basketball for Cornell University, and played professionally for Ironi Ashkelon in Israel.

Early and personal life
Jaques's was born and raised in Brentwood in Los Angeles, California, and is Jewish. His father is Doug Jaques, and his sister Clara was starting goalkeeper for the Washington University soccer team in St. Louis, where she was the all-time shutouts leader with 12 in one game.  He attended Hebrew school, and had a bar-mitzvah.  For high school, he attended and played basketball at Harvard-Westlake School in Los Angeles.

He is interested in a career in sports journalism. He has written a college basketball blog called "Blue Chips" for Slam Magazine, and written for The Quad, The New York Times''' online college sports blog.

College basketball career
He attended Cornell University (Biology; '10), and played basketball for four seasons for Cornell's Big Red men's basketball team, three of them with Ivy League Championship teams.  In 2009-10 he was team tri-captain and played in 31 games (7th-most in the Ivy League), and had 42 three-point field goals (10th in the league) as he led the league in three-point percentage at 47.2%, and also won the Men's Basketball Rebounder Award.MEN’S BASKETBALL | Jon Jaques ’10 Joins the Cornell Coaching Staff | The Cornell Daily Sun

 Professional basketball career 
After graduating from Cornell, Jaques made aliyah'' by moving to Israel, and signed with Ironi Ashkelon in Ligat HaAl, the top division of Israeli basketball.

For 2011-12, he was an assistant basketball coach of the Ducks at Stevens Institute of Technology in Hoboken, New Jersey. For the 2012-13 season he joined the Columbia University Lions men's basketball team as a graduate manager while attending the Mailman School of Public Health.

He is assistant men's basketball coach for Cornell University.

References

External links 
 Cornell profile
Twitter page

1988 births
Living people
American emigrants to Israel
American expatriate basketball people in Israel
20th-century American Jews
American men's basketball coaches
Basketball coaches from California
Basketball players from Los Angeles
Columbia Lions men's basketball coaches
Columbia University Mailman School of Public Health alumni
Cornell Big Red men's basketball coaches
Cornell Big Red men's basketball players
Harvard-Westlake School alumni
Ironi Ashkelon players
Israeli Jews
Jewish men's basketball players
People from Brentwood, California
21st-century American Jews